The 2010–11 ISU Grand Prix of Figure Skating was the ISU Grand Prix of Figure Skating series of the 2010–11 season. It was a series of six international invitational competitions in the fall of 2010 that built to the Grand Prix Final. Skaters competed in the disciplines of men's singles, ladies singles, pair skating, and ice dancing on the senior level. At each event, skaters earned points based on their placement toward qualifying for the Grand Prix Final. The top six scoring skaters or teams at the end of the series competed at the 2010–2011 Grand Prix Final, held in Beijing, China.

The Grand Prix series set the stage for the 2011 European, Four Continents, and World Championships, as well as each country's national championships. The Grand Prix series began on October 22, 2010, and ended on December 12, 2010.

The Grand Prix was organized by the International Skating Union. Skaters competed for prize money and for a chance to compete in the Grand Prix Final. The corresponding series for junior-level skaters was the 2010–11 ISU Junior Grand Prix.

Qualifying
Skaters who reached the age of 14 by July 1, 2010, were eligible to compete on the senior Grand Prix circuit. The top six skaters/teams from the 2010 World Figure Skating Championships were seeded and then guaranteed two events. Skaters/teams who placed 7th through 12th were also given two events, though they were not considered seeded.

Skaters and teams who were ranked in the top 24 in the world at the end of the 2009-10 season and those who had an ISU personal best in the top-24 on the season's best list for the 2009–10 season were also guaranteed one event.

Skaters/teams who medaled at the 2009–10 JGP Final or the 2010 World Junior Figure Skating Championships were guaranteed one event. Skaters who medaled at both the Junior Grand Prix Final and the World Junior Championships were guaranteed only one event.

The host country was allowed to assign three skaters/teams of their choosing from their country in each discipline.

The spots remaining were filled from the top 75 skaters/teams in the 2009–10 season's best list. Skaters could not be given a Grand Prix invitation without having been on the season's best list, with the following exceptions:
 The host country could select any three of their own skaters.
 Pairs and dance teams who had in either the 2008-09 or 2009–10 season qualified for Grand Prix spots by World Championships placement or had held a world ranking or season's best ranking in the top 24 with a previous partner could be considered for an alternate spot with their new partner.
 Skaters and teams who had previously been seeded (1st through 6th at the World Championships) and had missed any number of seasons could be considered for one or two Grand Prix assignments if they committed to competing at two Grand Prix events and had never taken advantage of this rule in a previous season.

Schedule

Medal summary

Grand Prix Final qualification points 

After the final event, the 2010 Trophée Eric Bompard, the six skaters/teams with the most points advanced to the Grand Prix Final. The point system is as follows:

There are seven tie-breakers in cases of a tie in overall points:
Highest placement at an event. If a skater placed 1st and 3rd, the tiebreaker is the 1st place, and that beats a skater who placed 2nd in both events.
Highest combined total scores in both events. If a skater earned 200 points at one event and 250 at a second, that skater would win in the second tie-break over a skater who earned 200 points at one event and 150 at another.
Participated in two events.
Highest combined scores in the free skating/free dancing portion of both events.
Highest individual score in the free skating/free dancing portion from one event.
Highest combined scores in the short program/original dance of both events.
Highest number of total participants at the events.

If there is still a tie, the tie is considered unbreakable and the tied skaters all qualify for the Grand Prix Final.

Qualification standings*
Skaters in bold qualified for the Grand Prix Final.

References 

 2010-2011 ISU Grand Prix of Figure Skating

External links 
 2009-2010 Season's Best Scores: Men's singles
 2009-2010 Season's Best Scores: Ladies singles
 2009-2010 Season's Best Scores: Pair skating
 2009-2010 Season's Best Scores: Ice Dancing

Isu Grand Prix Of Figure Skating, 2010-11
ISU Grand Prix of Figure Skating